The 2022 Clásica de San Sebastián was a road cycling one-day race that took place on 30 July 2022 in San Sebastián, Spain. It was the 41st edition of the Clásica de San Sebastián and the 24th event of the 2022 UCI World Tour.

The pre-race favourites included Remco Evenepoel and Tadej Pogačar, with the field split between riders looking to carry their Tour de France form into the event, and others using the race to build towards the late summer and autumn schedule. The race began on flat terrain, with the second half of the route mountainous and favouring those riders stronger at climbing.

Teams
All the 18 UCI WorldTeams and five UCI ProTeams made up the twenty-three teams that participated in the race.

UCI WorldTeams

 
 
 
 
 
 
 
 
 
 
 
 
 
 
 
 
 
 

UCI Professional Continental Teams

Result

References

External links 
 

2022
2022 UCI World Tour
2022 in Spanish road cycling
July 2022 sports events in Spain